Under Siege is a 1990 novel by Stephen Coonts.

Plot
A drug cartel chief is captured and brought to Washington DC for trial. The cartel throws everything they have to avenge him, including portable anti-air missiles, snipers, bomb trucks, and suicide squads armed with sub-machine guns.

Grafton is now member of joint service team that plan military aid for anti-drug campaigns. He is assigned to a local National Guard unit to battle the cartel, right in Washington DC. The president is shot down in his helicopter. Snipers shoot a senator, chief judge of the Supreme Court, and the attorney general. Worse, local drug dealers use the opportunity to battle among themselves with grenade launchers.

Army, national guard, police, FBI, and secret service hunt the assassins. The cartel strikes back at a National Guard armory. Washington DC's population, fed up with drugs, rally and lynch hundreds of addicts.

Characters
 Grafton - main character
 Tarkington - on shore duty and Grafton's aide
 Jack Yorke - a reporter who covers the action
 Harrisson - undercover anti-drug FBI agent

Reception
Kirkus Reviews found the novel to be "pessimistic", with an "implausible end", and noted that Coonts' characters are "more comfortable and convincing in the air than in the streets of Washington and the corridors of power".

References

1990 American novels
Novels by Stephen Coonts